Quetzalcoatl is a Mesoamerican deity. 

Quetzalcoatl or Quetzalcóatl can also refer to:
 Quetzalcóatl International Airport, located in Nuevo Laredo, Tamaulipas, Mexico
 Quetzalcoatl (Final Fantasy), a character from the Final Fantasy video game series
 Quetzalcoatl (Fate/Grand Order - Absolute Demonic Front: Babylonia), a character from the Fate/stay night franchise
 Quetzalcoatl (Miss Kobayashi's Dragon Maid), a character from the Miss Kobayashi's Dragon Maid manga series
 Quetzalcoatlus, a pterosaur from the Late Cretaceous of North America
 1915 Quetzálcoatl, a minor planet
 Cē Acatl Tōpīltzin Quetzalcōātl, Lord of the Toltecs in the 10th century
 Temple of the Feathered Serpent, Teotihuacan, also known as the Temple of Quetzalcoatl, and the Feathered Serpent Pyramid
 Quetzacoatl, a mobile game by the developer 1Button SARL
 Quetzalcoatl, a 1993 album by the band J Church
 Quetzalcoatl, a song by Azaghal from the album Omega
 Quetzalcóatl, a Cablebús station in Mexico City
 The Plumed Serpent or Quetzalcoatl, a political novel by D. H. Lawrence
 Quetzalcoatl, a large bird-like creature that appears in Godzilla: The Series. A creature by the same name appears on a monitor screen in Godzilla: King of the Monsters